Anopinella tergemina is a species of moth of the family Tortricidae. It is found in Peru.

The wingspan is 21 mm. The ground colour of the forewings is whitish with pale brownish dots and suffusions. The hindwings are brownish grey with darker strigulation (fine streaks).

Etymology
The species name refers to the costal forewing marking and is derived from Latin tergemina (meaning triangular).

References

Moths described in 2010
Anopinella
Moths of South America
Taxa named by Józef Razowski